Rye Coalition is a post-hardcore band based in Jersey City, New Jersey, United States. The band has released four full-length albums, three EPs, a split 12-inch with Karp, and several 7-inch records.

Rye Coalition has released most of their albums on the Tiger Style or Gern Blandsten Records labels. The band's most recent album, Curses, was produced by Dave Grohl. The album name refers to the band's 2003 deal to sign with the ill-fated Dreamworks Records. After Dreamworks Records was sold to Universal/Vivendi, the band ended up "jumping from one sinking ship to another", eventually ending up at Interscope Records. Interscope paid to record Curses, but the Rye Coalition was dissatisfied with the label. By mid-2004, Rye Coalition had managed to sever ties with the label and keep the rights to Curses, which they released on Gern Blandsten.

History
Rye Coalition began from a desire between Jersey City high school kids Jon Gonnelli (guitar) and Ralph Cuseglio (vocals) to form a band. They found their drummer in David Leto - an ex-member of legendary local Jersey band, Merel, whose status gave the group some instant interest in their home area - and a bassist in Leto's childhood friend, Justin Angelo Morey (Leto and Morey became friends while attending Our Lady of Mercy school together) Cuseglio, Gonnelli and Leto were schoolmates at St. Peter's Preparatory School. Taking a cue from local hardcore acts like Merel in their writing, the band (simply called Rye at the time) played chaotic, distorted songs with screamed vocals and more emphasis on dynamics than speed. Shortly after forming, Rye added Herb Wiley as a second guitarist.

The group's first recorded output took shape in the form of a demo entitled The Dancing Man, in 1994. The band quickly followed this with a self-booked tour of the east coast. The Dancing Man, as well as Rye's energetic live performances, caught the interest of local New Jersey label Troubleman Unlimited Records, who offered to press a 7-inch for the band. The record, entitled Teen-age Dance Session featured three songs and garnered the band further attention in the independent music scene. The 7-inch was released at a time when many bands playing similar style of emotionally charge hardcore were being dubbed emo by fans. This classification would dog Rye Coalition for a good portion of their career, much to their dismay (as the never considered themselves a part of the so-called genre).

Following the release of their first record, the band recorded two songs for a split 12-inch with Olympia, Washington's Karp, also released by Troubleman. The split would feature the band's first recording of the track "White Jesus of 114th Street," a fan favorite which remains in the band's setlists to this day. A split 7-inch with Harrisonburg, Virginia's Maximillian Colby was also release around this time. The Karp / Rye split would later be reissued on CD by Troubleman and also include the songs from the Teen-age Dance Session 7-inch. In 1995, the band crossed the Canadian border to play their first out-of-country show in Cambelville, Ontario.

Still fresh out of high school, the members of Rye struggled with the desire to pursue the band full-time as well as further their educations. Wiley parted ways with the band in 1996, following the release of the New Sherriff In Town 7-inch (the band's first for New Jersey's Gern Blandsten label), in order to attend school out-of-state. The 7-inch also marked their first time working with engineer Alap Momin  of Dälek.

Rye (by now adding "Coalition" to their name - or sometimes "Rye and the Coalition") continued on during downtime from their educations, now acting as a quartet. They wrote and recorded their first full-length LP, entitled Hee Saw Dhuh Kaet, in 1997. The band chose to again work with Alap Momin, and the album was released by Gern Blandsten Records.

By this time, the band was making a conscious effort to incorporate their other musical influences into their music, and move away from the confines of their earlier sound - vocals became slightly less aggressive, while not lacking in urgency, showing Cuseglio's true vocal prowess, and some elements of classic rock and even blues are apparent on the recording. The band's trademark tongue-in-cheek sense of humor also became more apparent on the record (song titles included "The Higher The Hair, The Closer To God," and "Fucking With Beautiful Posture"). Sporadic shows and small tours followed, but later that year, Justin Morey also left the band to pursue other interests.

At this point Dave Leto moved to bass and recruited his brother, Greg (also an ex-member of Merel) to take over the drums. The new lineup began work on their next album, entitled The Lipstick Game. Two years in the making, the album was again engineered by Alap Momin, is seen by many of their early fans as the band's pinnacle. It documents some of Rye Coalition's most powerful and experimental songwriting. Opening song "The Prosthetic Aesthetic" quickly ascertains that the band has sacrificed none of its energy, whereas songs like "Baby's Got A New Flame" and the title track exemplify the fusion of post-hardcore with classic rock that Rye Coalition would perfect on later releases, while the acoustic ballad "Tangiers" and closing instrumental track "Through The Years" are probably the group's most melodic songs ever recorded.

The record was well received by fans and the music press, and Rye Coalition again embarked on a tour to support the album, with Greg Leto leaving the band and Morey returning to take up bass duties again (Dave Leto switched back to drums). Following that, things slowed down again for the band, with shows happening on occasion as the members continued with their educations. Herb Wiley also returned to the fold in 2000 as the band was writing for their next album, thus reinstating the full original lineup of the band, which remains to this day.

In 2001, the band signed a deal with independent label Tiger Style, and recorded their third LP, On Top, this time working with respected engineer Steve Albini. The third album, released in 2002, was again a critical success, although some fans were dismayed by the band's further movement into classic rock territory. Rye Coalition now proudly wore their AC/DC and Led Zeppelin influences on their sleeve alongside those of Shellac and Fugazi. The record is essentially a perfect synthesis of those styles: arena rock guitar riffs and direct, often humorous, lyrics coupled with off kilter rhythms and distorted basslines.

The band undertook several tours to support the album, including a stop at 2002's Michigan Fest, from which their performance of "White Jesus of 114th Street" was included on a documentary DVD of the festival. A 5-song EP of tracks recorded with Albini during the On Top sessions was released in 2003 on Tiger Style as the Jersey Girls EP. The band also contributed covers of AC/DC's "Whole Lotta Rosie" and Grand Funk Railroad's "Got This Thing On The Move" for a contribution to Sub Pop Records' Singles Club series.

The critical success of On Top caught the attention of several major labels, and Rye Coalition was offered the opportunity to sign a major record contract for the release of their next album. The band decided to sign with Dreamworks Records. The band was signed by A&R Kenny "Tick" Salcido. The label had a history and reputation of helping up-and-coming bands receive more widespread attention and radio play (they had recently added such acts as Jimmy Eat World and Saves the Day to their roster), and Rye Coalition was able to maintain full creative control of their music.

To record their fourth album, the band put together a "wish list" of producers that they would like to work with. At the top of the list was ex-Nirvana drummer and Foo Fighters front man Dave Grohl. The band was surprised to find out that Grohl was not only a fan of the band, but also eager to work with them, and even more surprised when their record label agreed to the collaboration.

Production work on Rye Coalition's fourth full-length (later to be entitled Curses) began in 2004, but the record would not see release until 2006, and would not be released by Dreamworks. In October 2003, Dreamworks was acquired by Universal Music Group, and by 2004 was shut down completely. The artists on DreamWorks were split up and placed on either the Geffen Records or Interscope Records. Rye Coalition found themselves on a label who had essentially no interest in them (despite the label's telling the band otherwise), and although the bulk of the recording had been completed for Curses by this time, the record remained in limbo, with the Interscope's lack of interest in releasing it becoming more apparent to the band as time passed and mixing of the record was put on hold.

Rye Coalition took to the road during this time, relishing the opportunity to play the new songs live while struggling to get their record released properly. Grohl took the band as openers for Foo Fighters which gained them much exposure to mainstream audiences. An opening slot touring with The Mars Volta and Queens of the Stone Age garnered them further attention, but by 2005, the band had realized that Interscope had no intention of releasing their album.

The band asked to be released from their contract with the label, believing that if they did not want the record, that the band should take it to another label. Interscope initially refused, and noted that the band would have to pay an exorbitant sum in order to obtain the rights to their record back from the label. The band entered legal action against Interscope, eventually being released from their contract and getting their album back for nothing. By the end of 2005, the band had proceeded with mixing and mastering the album (again with help from Grohl), and decided to title the record Curses, in reference to their recent debacle with the label.

Rye Coalition then began another label search in an attempt to find a home for the record. They eventually decided to return to their roots and release the album with New Jersey's Gern Blandsten Records. A pre-release EP entitled Chariots On Fire was released as an iTunes exclusive in 2006, featuring three tracks from the upcoming album and one exclusive song, "Gone With The Windshield." By the time Curses was ready for release, it had expanded to also include a bonus DVD of the band's trials and tribulations while making the album.

Curses was finally made available in 2006 to critical and commercial success (thanks in no small part to the bands relentless touring). The new songs all but abandon Rye Coalition's early post-hardcore sound in favor of punchy, straight-head hard rock. A documentary about the making of the album, including footage working with Dave Grohl at Sound City Studios, was also included on Curses.

In 2007, bassist Justin Morey announced that he was quitting Rye Coalition to pursue The Black Hollies full-time.

Currently, Rye Coalition are still based in New Jersey, and have completed several tours of both the United States and Europe. A full-length documentary called "Rye Coalition - The Story of the Hard Luck 5" was released in 2014 about the band. Morey, Gonnelli and Wiley currently play in The Black Hollies on Ernest Jenning Records.

On February 19, 2011, Rye Coalition reunited for a single sold-out show at Maxwell's in Hoboken, New Jersey.

On July 4, 2021, on an appearance on the Protonic Reversal podcast, Dave Leto revealed that Rye Coalition were playing together again and planning on recording and releasing new material.

Discography

Full Length Albums
Hee Saw Dhuh Kaet (Gern Blandsten, 1996)
The Lipstick Game (Gern Blandsten, 1999)
On Top (Tiger Style Records, 2002)
Curses (Gern Blandsten, 2006)

EPs
The Dancing Man (Demo) (Self-released, 1994)
Karp / Rye Split 12-inch (Troubleman Unlimited, 1996)
Karp / Rye Split EP (compiles split 12-inch and first 7-inch) (Troubleman Unlimited, 1997)
Jersey Girls (Tiger Style Records, 2003)
Chariots On Fire (Gern Blandsten, 2006)

7"s
Maximillian Colby / Rye Coalition split 7-inch (Irony Records / Rent-A-Records, 1995)
Teen-age Dance Session 7-inch (Troubleman Unlimited, 1995)
New Sheriff In Town 7-inch  (Gern Blandsten, 1996)
Rye Coalition / The VSS split 2×7″ (Super 8 Records, 1998)
"ZZ Topless" (Tiger Style, 2001)
Got This Thing On The Move b/w Whole Lotta Rosie 7-inch (Sub Pop Records, 2003)

References

External links
Gern Blandsten Records
Rye Coalition: The Movie homepage and trailer
Rye Coalition: The Story of the Hard Luck Five official website 
Rye Coalition MySpace page
Rye Coalition on Spin.com

American post-hardcore musical groups
Punk rock groups from New Jersey
American musical trios
Culture of Jersey City, New Jersey